Daniel Kimoni (born 22 August 1971 in Belgium) is a Belgian retired footballer.

Honours
Genk
Belgian First Division: 1998–99
Belgian Cup: 1999–2000

References

External links
 

Belgian footballers
Living people
1971 births
Association football defenders
K.R.C. Genk players
R.F.C. Tilleur players
Standard Liège players
Grazer AK players
FC Augsburg players
C.S. Visé players
R.R.F.C. Montegnée players
Belgian Pro League players
Austrian Football Bundesliga players
Regionalliga players
Belgian expatriate footballers
Expatriate footballers in Austria
Belgian expatriate sportspeople in Austria
Expatriate footballers in Germany
Belgian expatriate sportspeople in Germany
Belgium international footballers